The 1998–99 Women's National Cricket League season was the third season of the Women's National Cricket League, the women's domestic limited overs cricket competition in Australia. The tournament started on 14 November 1998 and finished on 9 January 1999. Defending champions New South Wales Breakers won the tournament for the third time after topping the ladder at the conclusion of the group stage and beating Victorian Spirit by two games to zero in the finals series.

Ladder

Fixtures

1st final

2nd final

References

 
Women's National Cricket League seasons
 
Women's National Cricket League